Hliappui is a village in the Champhai district of Mizoram, India. It is located in the Ngopa R.D. Block. The Hliappui S. village is located nearby.

Demographics 

According to the 2011 census of India, Hliappui has 321 households. The effective literacy rate (i.e. the literacy rate of population excluding children aged 6 and below) is 97.05%.

References 

Villages in Ngopa block